Makiki is an area of Honolulu, Hawaii, located northeast of downtown Honolulu, stretching east to west from Punahou Street to Pensacola Street and north to south from Round Top Drive/Makiki Heights Drive to Lunalilo Freeway. Punchbowl, an extinct tuff cone, and Tantalus overlook the Makiki.

Composition of area
The area consists primarily of older houses, smaller apartment buildings, and side streets. Major roadways include Punahou Street, Pensacola Street, Piikoi Street, Nehoa Street, and Wilder Avenue. The area also includes a fire station, hospital, public school system, private schools including Punahou School, several churches of various denominations, a library, a community center, market place, and parks. The valley heights have hiking trails owned by the state for public use, and are mostly underdeveloped; a non-profit conservation organization, Hawaii Nature Center, has a small property providing conservation education and work opportunity to local schools students.
 
Two Makiki community organizations, Hui o Makiki and Friends of Makiki Community Library, have worked together to create a Makiki Community with information about educational, cultural, recreational, and social-service offerings in the Makiki area, including a calendar of events.

History
Punahou school was opened in Makiki on July 11, 1842, with the mission of educating missionary children, on a land grant of 200 acres from Governor Boki near the site of Kapunahou water spring.  Makiki is also the site of the Claus "King of Sugar" Spreckels Victorian-style mansion near Dole Street, which was later refurbished and converted into the St. Louis Alumni Clubhouse.  Lunalilo Home was opened in Makiki under the sponsorship of King William Charles Lunalilo for "the poor, the destitute, the infirm, and the aged people of Hawaiian blood or extraction, giving preference to old people."  Central Union Church on Beretania and Punahou streets was cornerstoned on December 2, 1922 (completed in 1924), on property that belonged to the Dillingham homestead.

Notable residents
Barack Obama was born in Makiki at Kapi'olani Medical Center for Women & Children and lived in Makiki for much of his childhood and adolescence, attending Punahou School. His maternal grandparents, Stanley Armour and Madelyn Dunham, rented an apartment in Makiki in which Obama lived mostly in his childhood.
Ferdinand Marcos and his wife Imelda Romualdez Marcos after losing the Philippine presidency in the 1986 People Power Revolution.
Bruno Mars, President Theodore Roosevelt High School, R&B Singer.
Brian Schatz, U.S. Senator of Hawaii, resides in the district.

References

External links

Neighborhoods in Honolulu